Associação Esportiva e Recreativa Santo Ângelo, commonly known as Santo Ângelo, is a Brazilian football club based in Santo Ângelo, Rio Grande do Sul state. The club was formerly known as Sociedade Esportiva e Recreativa Santo Ângelo.

History
The club was founded on September 26, 1989, after the merger of three local clubs: Grêmio Esportivo Santoangelense, Tamoyo Futebol Clube and Elite Clube Desportivo. The club won the Campeonato Gaúcho Second Level in 1995, after beating Palmeira das Missões-based club Palmeirense in the final. The club was renamed to Associação Esportiva e Recreativa Santo Ângelo in June 2011.

Achievements
 Campeonato Gaúcho Second Level:
 Winners (1): 1995

Stadium
Associação Esportiva e Recreativa Santo Ângelo play their home games at Estádio da Zona Sul. The stadium has a maximum capacity of 8,000 people.

References

Association football clubs established in 1989
Football clubs in Rio Grande do Sul
1989 establishments in Brazil